Lampsilis dolabraeformis is a species of freshwater mussel in the family Unionidae, the river mussels. It is known commonly as the Altamaha pocketbook. It is endemic to Georgia in the United States, where it is known only from the Altamaha River system.

The fish species eastern mosquitofish (Gambusia holbrooki) and largemouth bass (Micropteris salmoides) are hosts for the glochidia of this mussel.

References

Natural history of Georgia (U.S. state)
dolabraeformis
Bivalves described in 1838
Taxonomy articles created by Polbot